Andrei Andreyevich Iordan was a Kyrgyz statesman who served as the State Secretary of Kyrgyzstan and temporarily exercised the duties of Prime Minister from 29 November 1991 to 10 February 1992. He served as Minister of Industry and Foreign Trade and later as an adviser to the Prime Minister.

References 

1934 births
2006 deaths
People from Saratov Oblast
Prime Ministers of Kyrgyzstan
People's commissars and ministers of the Kirghiz Soviet Socialist Republic